Clay Village is an unincorporated community within Shelby County, Kentucky, United States. It was also known as Shytown. Their post office  is closed.

References

Unincorporated communities in Shelby County, Kentucky
Unincorporated communities in Kentucky